Su Lin is a female giant panda born at the San Diego Zoo on August 2, 2005.  Her name — one of five options in an online poll — means "a little bit of something very cute" in Chinese. 

Su Lin is the third cub born to her mother Bai Yun, and the second to her sire Gao Gao. Su Lin has one half-sister, through Bai Yun, Hua Mei. Like her full siblings Mei Sheng, Zhen Zhen, Yun Zi, and Xiao Liwu, she was conceived via natural mating.

Su Lin made her public debut in early December, 2005, and was weaned in early 2007.

Su Lin and her sister Zhen Zhen were sent to Bifengxia Panda Base in China on September 24, 2010.

In March 2011, Su Lin successfully bred with a male giant panda.  Shortly after, she was transferred to Hetaoping, where she delivered her first cubs, a male, and a stillborn cub on July 7 in a semi-wild environment. Later she and her cub were returned to Bifengxia, where they lived in a semi-wild situation at an area named New Leopard Mountain. Su Lin's son was named Yun Hui; he lived with two females who were also born in 2012. Yun Hui died in January 2015, two months from his fourth birthday.

References

External links
 San Diego Giant Panda Research Center
 Panda Fix

Individual giant pandas
2005 animal births
San Diego Zoo